The 2009 Fordham Rams football team was an American football team that represented Fordham University as a member of the Patriot League during the 2009 NCAA Division I FCS football season. In its fourth season under head coach Tom Masella, the team compiled a 5–6 record (2–4 against conference opponents) and played its home games at Jack Coffey Field in The Bronx.

The team was led on offense by six-foot, five-inch quarterback John Skelton. In a game against Cornell on October 17, 2009, Skelton passed for 420 yards and was responsible for six touchdown (five passing and one rushing).   During the 2009 season, Skelton led the NCAA FCS in passing yards (337 yards per game) and total passing yards (3,708). He finished his Fordham career as the school's all-time leader in pass completions, passing yards, and touchdown passes; he was inducted into the Fordham Athletic Hall of Fame in 2017. Skelton went on to play in the National Football League for the Arizona Cardinals, San Francisco 49ers, and Tennessee Titans.

The team's other statistical leaders included Xavier Martin with 700 rushing yards and Jason Caldwell with 79 receptions for 1,252 yards.

Schedule

References

Fordham
Fordham Rams football seasons
Fordham Rams football